is an English contract law case decided by the House of Lords on construction of a contract and the doctrine of fundamental breach.

Facts
Photo Productions Ltd engaged Securicor to guard their premises at night. A night-watchman, Mr Musgrove, started a fire in a brazier at Photo Production's factory to keep himself warm. The fire spread accidentally and the Photo Productions plant was totally destroyed by fire, causing £648,000-worth of damage. When Photo Productions  sued, Securicor argued that an exemption clause in the contract excused liability. The clause provided: "under no circumstances shall Securicor be responsible for any injurious act or default by any employee… unless such act or default could have been foreseen and avoided by the exercise of due diligence on the part of [Securicor]." Photo Productions argued that the clause could not apply under the doctrine of fundamental breach, that the breach of the contract went to the root of the contract, it invalidated the whole agreement and extinguished the exclusion clause.

Judgment

Court of Appeal
Lord Denning MR held that the doctrine of fundamental breach did apply, and that Securicor was liable. He said if the breach was fundamental then the exclusion clause would be invalid, following his decision in Harbutt's "Plasticine" Ltd v Wayne Tank and Pump Co Ltd. He said the following.

Shaw and Waller LJJ concurred. Securicor appealed.

House of Lords
The House of Lords overturned the Court of Appeal and held that Securicor's exclusion clause was effective and exempt it from liability for damage. Lord Diplock held that the clause’s effectiveness was a question of construction of the contract, and that it did cover the damage. He noted ‘the reports are full of cases in which what would appear to be very strained constructions have been placed upon exclusion clauses’ though the need should have gone since the passage of the Unfair Contract Terms Act 1977.

Lord Wilberforce, writing for the Court, overturned Denning and found that the exclusion clause could be relied upon. Wilberforce explicitly rejected Denning's application of the doctrine of fundamental breach and opted for a "rule of construction" approach. Exemption clauses are to be interpreted the same as any other term regardless of whether a breach has occurred. The scope of the exclusion is determined by examining the construction of the contract. On the facts, Wilberforce found that the exclusion clause precluded all liability even when harm was caused intentionally. He went out of his way to disapprove the doctrine of fundamental breach of contract.

Significance
The case is remembered for these principal reasons:
 first, the explicit rejection of the doctrine of fundamental breach under English law (and hence, by extension, for much of the common law world); and
 secondly, it is remembered as the high-water mark of the disputes between the Denning-led Court of Appeal and an increasingly unamused House of Lords, who strongly disapproved of Denning's attempts to remould the law in a manner that he perceived to fit the justice of the situation before him.
 thirdly, the case is a strong confirmation of the principles of the Suisse Atlantique case, which may now be considered the final statement of the common law prior to the Unfair Contract Terms Act 1977.

See also

English contract law

Notes

English termination case law
English unfair terms case law
House of Lords cases
Lord Wilberforce cases
Lord Denning cases
1980 in British law
1980 in case law